Sugarmonkey  are a four-piece rock guitar band based in London, UK.

History
London's Sugarmonkey played live in 2005. "They happen to be monumental in their handsomeness, and there’s certainly more still to recommend them" said Playlouder, while Outlineonline predicted that "this band will be big in the next 12 months, so jump on the bandwagon whilst there’s still room".

The band, made up of South African singer/guitarist Jo Edwards, Australian guitarist Chris Coutts, and Brits Ben Gibson on bass and drummer Dave Rees, were tipped at the start of the year by NME, their summer demo hailed by Hit Sheet, and GRTR! declared "this band could be snapping at the heels of their more established contemporaries in 2006".

The debut single "So Far Too Late" was released on 23 January 2006, the day their first UK tour began at East London's The Spitz. Flipside Magazine observed that So Far Too Late featured "dreamy melodies, choir boy vocal range, fine guitars and a killer chorus. Get ready for a sugar-coated overload in 2006."

With great things ahead, the Irish Post announced that "their essential musicianship shines through...the rock quartet clearly has hopes of the big time", with The Sun (referencing their simian moniker) confident that they "might not yet have enjoyed the same success as their monkey rivals but the rock group have plenty to crow about".

Television appearances
Sugarmonkey's first TV appearance is set for recording 9 August when they will perform and be interviewed on the "Official International Download TV Chart Show" at East London's Cargo club, broadcast afterwards on Sky/Invincible in 42 countries.

Band members
Jo Edwards – Vocals and guitar. Born of British parents in a small town in South Africa, Jo lived in London for 10 years, but moved to Melbourne, Australia, in 2010.
Chris Coutts – Guitar. Born in Sydney, Australia, Coutts has spent the last few years living in London.
Ben Gibson – Bass and vocals
Dave Rees – Drums

Videos
"Whatever I"
"So Far Too Late"
"Welcome to My Life"

References

External links
Official Website
Myspace Page
Band Management

Sugarmonkey
Musical groups from London